Nelsh Bailter Space is an EP by New Zealand band Bailter Space, released in 1987. It peaked at number 39 on the New Zealand Singles Chart.

Critical reception
Trouser Press wrote that "right from the band’s debut EP, Nelsh, guitarist John Halvorsen [Alister Parker] specialized in an abrasive, almost pitchless assault that could feel as polished and smooth as sheet metal, and his foils ... worked to feed that sound, contributing feedback gales and arty, disjointed backbeats that never felt fully settled." The Spin Alternative Record Guide called it "whiskey-sour pop sludge," singling out "El Whizzo."

Track listing
Side A
New Man    
El Whizzo (And Then)    
Our Aim   
Side B
I'm In Love With These Times (Written By Hamish Kilgour, David Kilgour, Peter Gutteridge)
Separate Circles    
Now I Will Live

Personnel
 Ross Humphries (bass)
 Hamish Kilgour (drums)
 Alister Parker (guitar, vocals)
 Glenda Bills (keyboards)

References

Dunedin Sound albums
Bailter Space albums
Flying Nun Records EPs
1987 EPs